is a Japanese musician and perennial candidate known for his naked election posters. He holds a number of nationalist views and has run as a candidate for Mayor of Chiyoda Ward, Tokyo (2013), City Assembly of Chiyoda (2015), Governor of Tokyo (2016), and Governor of Tokyo (2020).

According to his website, he wishes to make Japan the "strongest, kindest, and most interesting country in the world."

In 2016, his television speech became a meme on the Internet when he ran for governor of Tokyo. He continued to speak prohibited words, and as a result 10% of his speech was censored by NHK without his permission.

References

External links
 Homepage 
 Twitter page 

Living people
Japanese political candidates
Tokyo gubernatorial candidates
1982 births